The Raindrop is a 2000 Turkish comedy-drama film, directed by Zeki Ökten, which chronicles the friendship of five elderly residents of Bozcaada. It was described as, "sappy yet well narrated," by author Rekin Teksoy. The Turkish title "güle güle" means "goodbye" said by the one who stays, not by the one who leaves.

Synopsis
This film tells the story of a circle of five friends (four men and a woman) who are longtime residents of the Aegean island Bozcaada. The group includes a good-hearted auto mechanic, a retired military officer and his wife, an emotionally volatile bachelor, and Galip, a hopeless romantic who has corresponded with a Cuban woman, Rosa, for thirty-five years. When Galip at last vows to join her in Cuba, his friends make it their mission to reunite the pair.

Cast
Eşref Kolçak as Celal
Zeki Alasya as İsmet
Metin Akpınar as Galip
Yıldız Kenter as Zarife
Şükran Güngör as Şemsi
Yüksel Aksu
Ayşegül Aldinç
Haluk Bilginer
Kaan Çakır as Dilaver
Ece Uslu
Serra Yılmaz

References

External links 

2000 comedy-drama films
2000 films
Films set in Turkey
Films shot in Turkey
Golden Orange Award for Best Film winners
Turkish comedy-drama films
2000s Turkish-language films